The 2019 BYU Cougars women's soccer team represents BYU during the 2019 NCAA Division I women's soccer season. The Cougars are coached for a 25th consecutive season by Jennifer Rockwood, who was co-coach in 1995 and became the solo head coach in 1996. Before 1995 BYU women's soccer competed as a club team and not as a member of the NCAA. Overall the Cougars have made the NCAA tournament in 19 of the 24 seasons that Rockwood has been the head coach. Joining Rockwood as assistant coaches are Brent Anderson (3rd season) and Steve Magleby (2nd season) with volunteer assistants Rachel Jorgensen (6th season) and McKinzie Young (8th season). The Cougars came off of a season where they were first in the WCC and went 13–5–1, 8–1–0 in the WCC. The Cougars were picked to finish as co-champs by the WCC media.

Media

Television & Internet Streaming 
Most BYU women's soccer will have a TV broadcast or internet video stream available. BYUtv and WCC Network (the new name for TheW.tv) will once again serve as the primary providers. Information on these television broadcasts can be found under each individual match.

Nu Skin BYU Sports Network 

For a sixth consecutive season the BYU Sports Network will air BYU Cougars women's soccer games. Greg Wrubell will provide play-by-play for most games with Jason Shepherd filling-in when Wrubell has football duties. Analysts will rotate. ESPN 960 and BYU Radio will act as the flagship stations for women's soccer.

Affiliates
BYU Radio- KUMT 107.9 FM
ESPN 960- Provo, Utah

Schedule 
WCC game (*)
Nu Skin BYU Sports Network/ESPN 960 broadcast (x)
Television Broadcast (y)
Internet Stream (z)

Exhibition: Blue/White Game 
Three 30 minute periods made up the exhibition. Coaches were also free to move players from the Blue to the White and vice versa as it was an inter-squad match.

x-Exhibition: Colorado College
Broadcasters: Greg Wrubell & Avery Walker (ESPN 960)

xz-Alabama
Series History: First Meeting
Broadcasters: Gray Robertson & Hayley MacDonald (SEC+)Greg Wrubell & Avery Walker (BYUR 107.9 FM/ESPN 960)

xz-Mississippi State
Series History: First Meeting
Broadcasters: Anthony Craven & Chris Nasuti (SEC+)Greg Wrubell & Avery Walker (BYUR 107.9 FM/ESPN 960)

xz-Southern Utah
Series History: BYU leads series 2–0–0
Broadcasters:  Greg Wrubell & Avery Walker (WCC Network & BYUR 107.9 FM/ESPN 960)

xy-Utah
Game Name: Deseret First Duel
Series History: BYU leads series 22–7–2
Broadcasters: Jarom Jordan & Carla Haslam (BYUtv) Jason Shepherd & Avery Walker (BYUR 107.9 FM/ESPN 960)

xy-Texas A&M
Series History: Texas A&M leads series 1–0–0
Broadcasters: Spencer Linton & Carla Haslam (BYUtv)Greg Wrubell & Avery Walker (BYUR 107.9 FM/ESPN 960)

xz-Utah Valley
Game Name: UCCU Crosstown Clash
Series History: BYU leads series 4–0–0
Broadcasters:  Brandon Crow & Melanie Perkins (UVUtv/WAC DN) Greg Wrubell & Avery Walker (BYUR 107.9 FM/ESPN 960)

xz-Kansas
Series History: BYU leads series 3–1–1
Broadcasters: Josh Klingler & Huw Williams (ESPN+) Greg Wrubell & Avery Walker (BYUR 107.9 FM/ESPN 960)

xz-Kansas State
Series History: First Meeting
Broadcasters: James Westling, Oscar Montenegro, & Anna Christianson (ESPN+) Jason Shepherd & Avery Walker (BYUR 107.9 FM/ESPN 960)

xz-Long Beach State
Series History: BYU leads series 7–3–0
Broadcasters:  Jacob Hughey & Carlos Hernandez (Big West TV) Greg Wrubell & BJ Pugmire (BYUR 107.9 FM/ESPN 960)

xy-UC Irvine
Series History: BYU leads series 3–1–0
Broadcasters: Jarom Jordan & Carla Haslam (BYUtv) Jason Shepherd & Avery Walker (BYUR 107.9 FM/ESPN 960)

xz-Santa Clara*
Series History: Santa Clara leads series 7–2–4
Broadcasters: David Gentile (WCC Network) Greg Wrubell & Avery Walker (ESPN 960)

xz-Pepperdine*
Series History: Pepperdine leads series 6–4–0
Broadcasters: Spencer Linton, Brian Dunseth, & Jason Shepherd (byutv.org)Greg Wrubell & Avery Walker (BYUR 107.9 FM/ESPN 960)

xy-Pacific*
Series History: BYU leads series 6–1–0
Broadcasters: Jarom Jordan & Carla Haslam (BYUtv)Jason Shepherd & Avery Walker (BYUR 107.9 FM/ESPN 960)

xz-Saint Mary's*
Series History: BYU leads series 8–0–1
Broadcasters: Greg Wrubell & Elena Medeiros (WCC Network & BYUR 107.9 FM/ESPN 960)

xz-Portland*
Series History: BYU leads series 9–4–0
Broadcasters: Tom Kolker (WCC Network)  Greg Wrubell & Elena Medeiros (BYUR 107.9 FM/ESPN 960)

xy-San Diego*
Series History: BYU leads series 8–3–0
Broadcasters: Spencer Linton & Carla Haslam (BYUtv) Greg Wrubell & Elena Medeiros (BYUR 107.9 FM/ESPN 960)

xz–San Francisco*
Series History: BYU leads series 7–2–0
Broadcasters: Pat Olson & Jim Duggan (WCC Network) Jason Shepherd & Avery Walker (BYUR 107.9 FM/ESPN 960)

xz-Gonzaga*
Series History: BYU leads series 11–0–0
Broadcasters: Mark (WCC Network) Greg Wrubell & Elena Medeiros (BYUR 107.9 FM/ESPN 960)

xz-Loyola Marymount*
Series History: BYU leads series 8–1–1
Broadcasters: Jason Shepherd & Avery Walker (WCC Network & BYUR 107.9 FM/ESPN 960)

xy-NCAA 1st Round: Boise State
Series History: First Meeting
Broadcasters: Spencer Linton & Carla Haslam (BYUtv) Greg Wrubell & Avery Walker (BYUR 107.9 FM)

xy-NCAA 2nd Round: Louisville
Series History: First Meeting
Broadcasters: Spencer Linton, Carla Haslam, & Jason Shepherd (BYUtv) Greg Wrubell & Avery Walker (BYUR 107.9 FM)

xy-NCAA Sweet 16: NC State
Series History: First Meeting
Broadcasters: Jarom Jordan & Carla Haslam (BYUtv) Jason Shepherd & Avery Walker (BYUR 107.9 FM)

xy-NCAA Elite 8: Stanford
Series History: Stanford leads series 4–3
Broadcasters:  Troy Clardy & Joaquin Wallace (P12+ STAN) Greg Wrubell & Avery Walker (BYUR 107.9 FM/ESPN 960)

Roster

Rankings

References 

2019 in sports in Utah
2019 West Coast Conference women's soccer season
BYU
2019 team